"Sam's Place" is a 1967 country song written by Red Simpson and recorded by Buck Owens.  The single went to number one on the country charts spending three weeks at the top and a total of thirteen weeks on the country charts.

Content
The song is about a honky-tonk called "Sam's Place," of which the singer is a regular all-night patron ("You can always find me down at Sam's Place from the setting sun until the break of day.").  Other patrons include two women who are nicknamed for their dancing abilities and whose real names happen to rhyme with their respective hometowns: "Shimmy-Shakin'" Tina from Pasadena and "Hootchie-Kootchie" Hattie from Cincinnati.

Chart performance

References
 

Buck Owens songs
1967 singles
Songs written by Buck Owens
Song recordings produced by Ken Nelson (American record producer)
Capitol Records singles
1967 songs